Katarina Srebotnik was the defending champion, but lost in first round to Seda Noorlander.

Anke Huber won the title by defeating Nathalie Dechy 6–2, 1–6, 7–5 in the final.

Seeds

Draw

Finals

Top half

Bottom half

References
 Main and Qualifying Draws (WTA)

Portugal Open
2000 WTA Tour
Estoril Open